In January 2019, Subodh Karnik became the President and Chief Executive Officer (CEO) of the now-defunct ExpressJet, an American regional airline. He is also the co-owner of KAir Enterprises, which owned 50.1% of ExpressJet. Karnik was named as the head of ExpressJet on December 21, 2018.  

Prior to ExpressJet, Karnik served as President and CEO of CommutAir from January 2015 to January 2019 and the President and CEO of Global Aero Logistics, the parent company of World Airways, North American Airlines and ATA Airlines, between 2005 and 2009. Earlier in his career Karnik also held senior corporate officer positions at Delta, Continental and Northwest.

A native of Mumbai, India, Karnik graduated from the Birla Institute of Technology and Science and the University of Michigan Ross School of Business.

References

Year of birth missing (living people)
Living people
Ross School of Business alumni
American airline chief executives
Birla Institute of Technology and Science, Pilani alumni